María Anna Aguilar Velarde (March 3, 1695 – February 25, 1756), more commonly known as Sor María Anna Águeda de San Ignacio, was a Mexican author. 

She was born in Atlixco in New Spain (now Mexico) to a Spanish father and an American mother. In 1714, at the age of nineteen, she entered the Beaterio de Santa Rosa, a Catholic convent in Puebla. 

In 1740, she was elected abbess of the convent. Aguilar was a prolific writer on religious subjects and her writing was highly regarded during her lifetime. She authored four treatises on mystical and theological subjects as well as spiritual guidebooks for nuns.

References

1695 births
1756 deaths
Writers from Puebla
People from Atlixco
Mexican Roman Catholic religious sisters and nuns
Mexican Roman Catholic abbesses
18th-century Roman Catholics
18th-century Mexican writers
18th-century Mexican women writers